Pasalari (also Romanized as Pāsālārī) is a village in Nasrovan Rural District, in the Central District of Darab County, Fars Province, Iran. At the 2006 census, its population was 137, in 30 families.

References 

Populated places in Darab County